Avinashi road Flyover also known as Uppilipalayam flyover or Roundana is a roundabout flyover in Coimbatore that connects the Northern and Eastern areas with other parts of the city. It is built across the railway line connecting Coimbatore's main junction. The flyover forms one end of Avinashi Road. It is one of the most important interchanges in Coimbatore and is crucial to carry traffic from each side of the railway line that cuts through the city.

History
The flyover was built in 1974 and was the second flyover to be opened in Tamil Nadu after the Anna flyover. It was also the first grade separator in India to have a roundabout. The flyover was built due to traffic congestion caused by the railway crossing near the junction. The flyover connects the Northern and Eastern areas with other parts of the city. Though the flyover helped in reducing congestion, flaws in the bridge require modifications. No pedestrian corridor is available. Modifications have been suggested to improve the situation. The bridge lacks maintenance leaving the structure weakened.

Location
The flyover is located near the railway station. The flyover connects Avinashi road, Brook Bond road, Mmill road and Goods shed road.

Gallery

See also
 Flyovers in Coimbatore

References

Bridges in Tamil Nadu
Flyovers in Coimbatore